Sundance Beach is a summer village in Alberta, Canada. It is located on the northern shore of Pigeon Lake. Mission Beach is a locality within the summer village.

Demographics 

See also 
List of communities in Alberta
List of summer villages in Alberta
List of resort villages in Saskatchewan

References

External links 

1970 establishments in Alberta
Edmonton Metropolitan Region
Leduc County
Summer villages in Alberta